Razbashi may refer to:

Buganeh Razbashi
Chenar-e Razbashi
Darber-e Razbashi